Fortunato Arriola (1827–1872), born in Cosalá, Sinaloa, Mexico, was a painter of portraits and luminous tropical landscapes that were very popular in San Francisco, California, where he came to live in 1857.  

The son of a wealthy landowner, Arriola was a handsome, distinguished and cultivated man. He was self-taught as an artist and began his career painting portraits. His style was realistic, which he carried into his paintings of nature landscape scenes, for which he is most well-known. Contemporary critics especially praised Arriola’s paintings depicting moonlight and tropical scenes.

He had a studio near the corner of Kearney and Clay Streets that was a gathering place for Mexican exiles, a place of intellectual ferment and the occasional brawl. Among his students were Toby Rosenthal and Ransom Holdredge.  Most of his works, imagined views of Central America, disappeared after he died.  His largest painting, "Sunset in the Tropics" measures about 5 ft. by 7 ft. in its original frame

The artist exhibited his work at the Mechanics Institute Fairs in 1864 and 1865 as well as the National Academy of Design in 1872. 

In 1872, he traveled to New York City to exhibit two paintings at the National Academy of Design. He was returning to San Francisco on the Bienville which was carrying a load of dynamite.  It exploded at Watling Island, Bahamas on August 15, 1872.   He died at sea, leaving a widow and six children.

Fortunato Arriola's work has been viewed at auctions, selling at prices ranging from $3,500 USD to $27,500 USD. 
His work "Moonlit river gorge" sold at Bonhams Los Angeles in 2014 for $27,500 USD.

Paintings
His paintings include:
 Portrait of a young girl
 Portrait of a young woman
 Nancy Nellie Hall Bacon, Thomas Jefferson’s Niece
 Sunset on the Sacramento River
 Sunset in the Tropics
 View of the Golden Gate
 Moon over Nicaragua
 Santa Barbara Coast
 Twilight in the Tropics
 Tropical Landscapes
 Luminous Sunset with Sailboats
 Evening Smoke by the Mosque
 Lost in the Arctic Ice, 1864
 South American Landscapes, circa 1866
 View Looking out the Golden Gate, 1868
 Moonlit river gorge, 1870
 Twilight Along the Nile at Luxor, 1872

Museum collections
 California Historical Society
 Cantor Art Center, Stanford University
 Crocker Art Museum, Sacramento, California
 Oakland Museum of California
 Courthouse Museum, Shasta State Historic Park

Several additional paintings are in the private collection of actor Steve Martin.

Pop Culture References
Fortunato Arriola was covered in a podcast episode called "Fortunato Arriola - Wikicast 075" published in May 2020.

References

American landscape painters
Mexican landscape painters
1827 births
1872 deaths
Painters from California
American male painters
Artists from Sinaloa
Artists from the San Francisco Bay Area
American artists of Mexican descent
Mexican emigrants to the United States
19th-century American painters
19th-century Mexican painters
19th-century American male artists
Mexican male painters
19th-century Mexican male artists
Deaths from explosion
People who died at sea